Shahbazpur is a village situated in the district of Gujrat, Pakistan. Chenab passes through the eastern border of the village.

References

Villages in Gujrat District